The following lists events that happened during 2014 in Botswana.

Incumbents
 President: Ian Khama 
 Vice President: Ponatshego Kedikilwe (until 12 November), Mokgweetsi Masisi (starting 12 November)

Events

February
 February 19 - Botswana ends diplomatic relations with North Korea following a United Nations report on the latter's human rights record.

October
 October 24 - Voters in Botswana go to the polls for a general election with the ruling Botswana Democratic Party of President Ian Khama winning 33 of 57 seats.

References

 
2010s in Botswana
Years of the 21st century in Botswana
Botswana
Botswana